Hespererato scabriuscula is a species of small sea snail, a marine gastropod mollusk in the family Eratoidae, the false cowries or trivias. and allies

Distribution
This species occurs in the China Sea.

References

 Fehse D. (2016). Contributions to the knowledge of the Eratoidae. XI. New species in the genus Hespererato F.A. Schilder, 1925. Neptunea. 14(1): 30–36

External links
 Sowerby I, G. B. & Sowerby II, G. B. (1832–1841). The conchological illustrations or, Coloured figures of all the hitherto unfigured recent shells. London, privately published

Eratoidae
Gastropods described in 1832